John Raymond McCambridge (born August 30, 1944) was an American and Canadian football player who played for the Ottawa Rough Riders and Detroit Lions. He won the Grey Cup with Ottawa in 1969. He previously played college football at Northwestern University.

References

1944 births
Living people
Ottawa Rough Riders players
Players of American football from Oregon
People from Klamath Falls, Oregon
Northwestern Wildcats football players
American football defensive ends
Canadian football defensive linemen
Detroit Lions players
American players of Canadian football